Miranda J. Lubbers is a Dutch social scientist specializing in the analysis of migration, segregation, and social identity through personal networks. She is an associate professor in the Department of Social and Cultural Anthropology of the Autonomous University of Barcelona, and director of the Research Group of Fundamentally Oriented Anthropology (GRAFO).

Education and career
Lubbers studied social science at the University of Groningen, completing her Ph.D. there in 2004. She remained at the University of Groningen for two more years as a postdoctoral researcher, and then spent two years as a lecturer at the University of Rovira i Virgili before moving to the Autonomous University of Barcelona as a researcher and since 2015 as an associate professor.

Book
Lubbers is the coauthor of the book Conducting Personal Network Research: A Practical Guide (Guilford Press, 2019, with Christopher McCarty, Raffaele Vacca, and José Luis Molina).

References

External links

Year of birth missing (living people)
Living people
Dutch social scientists
Dutch women social scientists
University of Groningen alumni
Academic staff of the Autonomous University of Barcelona